Cycloocta-1,3,6-triene is an organic chemical compound related to cyclooctatetraene. It is an example of a cycloalkene which exhibits geometric isomerism. It is sometimes used in synthesizing cyclooctatetraene.

References

Cycloalkenes